Son Goku or Son-Goku may refer to:

 Monkey King or Sun Wukong, the main character in the 16th century novel Journey to the West, better known as Son Goku in Japan
 Goku or Son Goku, the main character in Dragon Ball media
 Son Goku (band), a German rock band
 Son Goku (Saiyuki), a lead character in the Saiyuki manga and anime
 Son Goku (wrestler), a ring name of professional wrestler Masa Takanashi (born 1983)
 Son-Goku, a character in Alakazam the Great media
 Monkey Sun (1959), a Japanese film directed by Kajirō Yamamoto
 Son Goku, a four-tailed ape in Naruto
 Son Goku, a descendant of the Monkey King in the anime adaptation of Inuyasha

See also
Goku (disambiguation)